Bharucha Hasim bin Yusuf, better known by his pen name Zar Randeri, was a Gujarati poet and translator from Gujarat, India. He was born in Rander, a town in Surat, Gujarat. He received his primary and secondary education in Rander and then went to Aminiyah Arabiyah, a Madrasa in Delhi, for further education. He published the first Gujarati book on Persian metres as Shairi in two volumes in 1936. His other notable works include Shamshire Sadakat, Hindustan Na Humla, Aatma Ane Punarjanma. He translated and published several works such as Kasdussabil (1913), Muhannad, Dharmaprachar, Mahatma Ane Islam and Hindustani Bhasha.

References

Gujarati-language writers
20th-century Indian poets
People from Surat district
Gujarati-language poets
Poets from Gujarat
1887 births
Indian male poets
Date of death missing
20th-century Indian male writers
Date of death unknown